Tag (foaled 1786) was a British Thoroughbred racehorse. She started only three races, and won once, the Oaks Stakes at Epsom Downs. She was owned by George Wyndham, 3rd Earl of Egremont, and trained by Frank Neale. As a broodmare for the Earl she produced eleven foals.

Background
Tag was a bay filly bred by George Wyndham, 3rd Earl of Egremont, and foaled in 1786.
She was sired by Trentham, a successful racehorse who ran for eight years, winning many races, including two Jockey Club Plates. Her dam was Venus, a daughter of Eclipse and full-sister to Jupiter, Mercury and Volunteer.

Racing career
On 29 May 1789 at Epsom Downs, Tag competed in her first race, the Oaks Stakes. Along with the filly Hope, she started as the 5/2 joint-favourite. Eighteen fillies had initially been entered for the race, but only seven started. Tag won the race from Earl Grosvenor's sister to Trifle, with Hope finishing in third place, the filly by Magnet in fourth and Restless in fifth. The other two runners could not be placed by the judge. The following day she was withdrawn from a match race against the Duke of Bedford's Skyscraper. In June at Ascot Heath, she lost a mile and a quarter match race against the colt Magpie. Her final race came in July 1789 at Brighthelmstone in a £50 race consisting of four, one mile and three quarter heats. Tag started as the favourite of the four runners, priced at about evens. She won the first heat, Skyrocket won the second heat, but Mentor won the last two heats to win the race.

Stud career
As a broodmare for the Earl of Egremont she produced eleven foals, including Tag, Gulliver, Lazy, Baby and Old Maid. Lazy was the dam of Ascot Gold Cup winner Anderida. She has descendants today through the grandson of her 1796 daughter by Precipitate, St John, who was sent to Australia in 1836.

Pedigree

Note: b. = Bay, br. = Brown, ch. = Chestnut

* Tag was inbred 4x4 to Partner and Regulus. This means that both stallions appear twice in the fourth generation of her pedigree.

References

1786 racehorse births
Racehorses bred in the Kingdom of Great Britain
Racehorses trained in the Kingdom of Great Britain
Thoroughbred family 9-b
Epsom Oaks winners